Micah Paulino  is a Guamanian footballer who plays as a defender who plays for the American club the Niagara Purple Eagles and the Guam national team.

References

Living people
1992 births
Guamanian footballers
Guam international footballers
Niagara Purple Eagles men's soccer players
Association football defenders